Kolda (Wolof: Koldaa) is a city located in southern Senegal. It is the capital city of Kolda Region and Kolda Department, a region known historically and popularly as Haute Casamance.

History

The name Kolda derives from the name of the city's founder Koly Dado who first created a settlement near the shores of the Casamance River.

Administration
Kolda is the chief city of Kolda Department and of the Kolda Region.

Geography
The city is located on National Road 6, also called the "southern route" due to the fact that it goes from Dakar to Ziguinchor through Tambacounda, Vélingara and Kolda. Dakar, the capital city of Sénégal, is located 670 kilometers from Kolda.

Local administrative districts include Bantanguel, Doumassou, Ndiobène, Sarè
Moussa, Gadapara, Sarè Kemo, Sinthiang Tountouroung, Sinthiang Idriss, Escale, Sikilo, and Faraba. Kolda is the main capital of the region incorporating the two departments of Velingara and Fafacourou.

Physical geology and climate
Both vegetation and rainfall are abundant in Kolda. The wet season lasts for five months, from June through October. The dry season begins in November and ends in May.

The annual average temperature is 81.9 °F with a maximum of 94.8 °F in April, May and October, and a minimum of 68.7 °F in January and August.

Demographics
As 2002, Kolda's population was 53,921. In 2007, official estimations, numbered the population at 62,258 inhabitants. The majority population is members of the Fula ethnic group. Mandinke and Jola ethnic groups are also present.

Economy
A Center of Zootechniques Research (CRZ) was established in Kolda in 1972. Major crops include cotton, cereals like miley, fonio, peanut and another vegetables. Kolda also has major sheep, cattle, and dairy production. Kolda is abundant in fruits such as mangoes, oranges, and acajou nuts.

Notables
Cherif Mohamed Aly Aidara - Islamic religious leader and founder of international NGO Mozdahir (born in Darou Hidjiratou)
Sidney Toure (poet, actor, activist)
Moriba Pascal Doumbia (educator)
El Hadj Omar Fall (educator)
 Mère Henry Ronk (Catholic Mission) - caregiver 
 Ablaye Diallo (Zal), footballer
Massamba Sambou, football player
, poet
 Ablaye Cissoko, Singer, Musician 
 General 
 Sada Kane, journalist
 Barou Balde, Adjunct Mayor
Bécaye Diop, Minister of State, Minister of the Armed Forces, and Mayor of Kolda

References

 

 
Populated places in Kolda Region
Regional capitals in Senegal
Casamance River
Communes of Senegal